Tyurikovskaya is a rural locality (a village) in Yavengskoye Rural Settlement, Vozhegodsky District, Vologda Oblast, Russia. The population was 30 as of 2002.

Geography 
Tyurikovskaya is located 39 km northeast of Vozhega (the district's administrative centre) by road. Turovo is the nearest rural locality.

References 

Rural localities in Vozhegodsky District